Lithospermum erythrorhizon, commonly called purple gromwell, red stoneroot, red gromwell, red-root gromwell and redroot lithospermum, is a plant species in the genus Lithospermum. It is called zǐcǎo in Chinese, jichi in Korean, and murasaki in Japanese.

The dried root of Lithospermum erythrorhizon (lithospermum root or Lithospermi Radix) is a Chinese herbal medicine with various antiviral and biological activities, including inhibition of human immunodeficiency virus type 1 (HIV-1).

The genome sequence of Lithospermum erythrorhizon is sequenced and has facilitated the discovery of a putative retrotransposition-derived duplication event that produced a 4-hydroxybenzoate geranyltransferase gene involved in alkannin biosynthesis.

Biochemistry 
The enzyme 4-hydroxybenzoate geranyltransferase utilizes geranyl diphosphate and 4-hydroxybenzoate to produce 3-geranyl-4-hydroxybenzoate and diphosphate. Biosynthetically, alkannin is produced in plants from the intermediates 4-hydroxybenzoic acid and geranyl pyrophosphate. This enzyme is involved in shikonin biosynthesis.

The enzyme [[geranylhydroquinone 3-hydroxylase]] uses geranylhydroquinone, NADPH, H+ and O2 to produce 3-hydroxygeranylhydroquinone, NADP+ and H2O.

Uses
It has been cultivated in Japan since the Nara period for its root, which can be used for herbal medicine and to make dyes.Wada Yoshiko; Mary Kellogg Rice, and Jane Barton (1983). Shibori: The Inventive Art of Japanese Shaped Resist Dyeing. Kodansha, pp. 278–279. .

The process of extracting purple dyestuff from the roots was an exceedingly long, complex and time-consuming process, necessitating its relatively high expense:

One Japanese word for the plant, murasaki (紫), inspired the pen name "Lady Murasaki" for the author of The Tale of Genji and is also the source of the general Japanese term for the color purple, murasaki iro (紫色).

The dyes made from its root also had other names, such as shikon (紫根), but all of them were difficult to work with because of their requirement for an alum-rich mordant and the resulting colors' extreme vulnerability to photobleaching. During the Heian Period, sumptuary laws restricted murasaki''-dyed clothing to the Empress and her ladies in waiting.

See also 
 List of kampo herbs

References 

erythrorhizon
Plants described in 1846